Transtillaspis rioverdensis is a species of moth of the family Tortricidae. It is found in Tungurahua Province, Ecuador.

The wingspan is 14 mm. The ground colour of the forewings is ferruginous, strigulated (finely streaked) with brown. The hindwings are brown.

Etymology
The species name refers to Rio Verde, the type locality.

References

Moths described in 2005
Transtillaspis
Moths of South America
Taxa named by Józef Razowski